Stephanie Zacharek is an American film critic at Time, based in New York City. From 2013 to 2015, she was the principal film critic for The Village Voice. She was a 2015 Pulitzer Prize finalist in criticism.

Early life
Stephanie Zacharek received a Bachelor of Science degree from the S.I. Newhouse School of Public Communications at Syracuse University, in New York.

Career 
In the 1990s, Zacharek worked for The Boston Phoenix and Inc. From 1999 to 2010, she was a film critic and senior writer at Salon.com, where her husband, Charles Taylor, was also a film critic until 2005. She became chief film critic of Movieline in 2010, and left in mid-2012. 
In April 2013, the Voice Media Group hired her as chief film critic of The Village Voice. In February 2018, she was selected to be on the jury for the main competition section of the 68th Berlin International Film Festival.

Zacharek was the only Top Critic on Rotten Tomatoes to vote Finding Nemo a rotten movie.

References

External links 

Stephanie Zacharek at Rotten Tomatoes

Living people
American film critics
National Society of Film Critics Members
American columnists
The Village Voice people
American women film critics
American women columnists
Year of birth missing (living people)
Syracuse University alumni
21st-century American women
American women critics